Lequire is an unincorporated community and census-designated place (CDP) in Haskell County, Oklahoma, United States.

A post office was established at Lequire, Indian Territory on December 12, 1906. It was named for P.H. Lequire, a local sawmill operator. The post office uses ZIP code 74943.

At the time of its founding, Lequire was located in the Moshulatubbee District of the Choctaw Nation.

Demographics

References

Unincorporated communities in Haskell County, Oklahoma
Unincorporated communities in Oklahoma
Census-designated places in Haskell County, Oklahoma
Census-designated places in Oklahoma